Matthew Dolan may refer to:

 Matt Dolan (born 1965), former member of the Ohio House of Representatives
 Matthew Dolan (footballer) (born 1993), English footballer